JD or jd may refer to:

Arts and entertainment 
 JD (film), a 2016 Bollywood film
 J.D. (Scrubs), nickname of Dr. John Dorian, fictional protagonist of the comedy-drama Scrubs
 JD Fenix, a character from the Gears of War video game series
 J. D.'s Revenge, 1976 motion picture
 Jade Dynasty (video game), a 2007 fantasy MMORPG
 Just Dance (video game series), video game series
"J.D.", an episode of the sixth season of Fear the Walking Dead

Businesses and organizations
 JD.com, a Chinese electronic commerce company
 Jack Daniel's, a whiskey brand, distilled in Tennessee, US
 Janata Dal, a political party in India
 John Deere, an agricultural machinery manufacturer
 JD Edwards, a former computer software company
 JD Sports, a UK retail company
 JD Wetherspoon, a UK  pub and restaurant chain 
 Justdial, an Indian local search agency
 Dawson State Jail, operated by the Corrections Corporation of America and owned by the Texas Department of Criminal Justice
 Justice Democrats, an American political action committee
 Jnana Deepa, Institute of Philosophy and Theology, Pontifical Athenaeum, Pune, India
 Beijing Capital Airlines (IATA code JD), a Chinese airline

People
 J Dilla (1974–2006), also known as Jay Dee, a late hip-hop producer
 Jaydee (born 1958), stage name for Robin Albers, a Dutch house music producer and DJ
 Jermaine Dupri (born 1972), rapper/music producer also known as JD
 John Doe/Jane Doe, a placeholder name for a party whose true identity is unknown or must be withheld
 Jonathan Davis (born 1971), American musician/singer from the nu metal band Korn
 Jonathon Douglass (born 1981), Australian Christian musician/singer at the Hillsong Church in Sydney, Australia
 Lee Jae-dong (born 1990), professional video game player
JD Hammer (born 1994), American Major League Baseball pitcher for the Philadelphia Phillies
 J. D. Beresford (1873–1947), English writer
 J. D. Dillard, American director, screenwriter, and producer
 J. D. Frank, actor and mixed martial artist who played the Green and White Power Ranger
 J. D. Jones (born 1936), American firearms and cartridge designer, firearms writer, and president of SSK Industries
 J. D. Salinger (1919–2010), American author
 J. D. Power (born 1931), Founder of J.D. Power and Associates
 J. D. Roth (born 1968), television personality
 Jadeveon Clowney (born 1993), American football defensive end

Other uses 
 Juris Doctor (J.D.), a law degree
 Jamesville-DeWitt Central School District, New York
 Java Decompiler, computer programmer's tool to decompile Java class files
 Jersey Devil, a cryptozoological animal
 Job description, an abbreviation for a person's nature of job or terms of reference (TOR)
 Jordanian dinar, the currency of Jordan (unofficially abbreviated "JD")
 Journal of Discourses, a historical periodical of The Church of Jesus Christ of Latter-day Saints
 Julian day, the Julian day number (JDN) plus the decimal fraction of the day
 Juvenile delinquent